Amarte a la Antigua is an album by Mexican recording artist Pedro Fernández, released by Fonovisa Records on October 20, 2009. The album received a Latin Grammy Award nomination for Best Ranchero Album. The title song was the closing theme song of the award-winning telenovela Hasta que el dinero nos separe which won Fernández the TVyNovelas Award for Best Actor. The title song also won the Latin Grammy Award for Best Regional Mexican Song (2010) for "Amarte a la Antigua", The popular video performance of the titled theme song is also from the telenovela.

Critical reception

Alex Henderson of allmusic gave the album a mostly positive review, citing that Fernandez "enjoys variety" and said the album is "likable".

Track listing

Charts

Weekly charts

Year-end charts

Certifications

References

2009 albums
Pedro Fernández (singer) albums
Fonovisa Records albums